Gar Tagu Risum (? – ?) was a general of the Tibetan Empire. He was the fourth son of minister Gar Tongtsen Yülsung. In Chinese records, his name was given as Xīduōyú.

According to Old Tibetan Annals, his eldest brother Gar Tsenye Dompu came into conflict with another minister Gar Mangnyen Taktsab in 685, and was killed by a river in Sumpa. Tagu's another brother Gar Trinring Tsendro came into power. Tagu put down a rebellion in rtsang chen together with Trinring in 687.

In 692, the Chinese troops led by Wang Xiaojie invaded Tibet in order to recapture the lost land: Four Garrisons of Anxi. Tagu fought together with his brothers Trinring, Tsenyen Gungton, and Western Turks' khan Ashina Tuizi (阿史那俀子). Tibetan was defeated in this battle. Two years later, Chinese invaded Tibet again, and defeated Tibetan troops near Qinghai Lake. Tagu fled but was captured by Sogdian people.

References
Old Tibetan Annals (version I), P.T. 1288
New Book of Tang, vol. 230

7th-century Tibetan people
People of the Tibetan Empire